Daniel Smith (born 28 May 1991) is an Australian swimmer. He competed in the men's 4 × 200 metre freestyle relay event at the 2016 Summer Olympics.

References

External links
 

1991 births
Living people
Australian male freestyle swimmers
Olympic swimmers of Australia
Swimmers at the 2016 Summer Olympics
Place of birth missing (living people)
Medalists at the FINA World Swimming Championships (25 m)